Two ships of the United States Navy have been named Chemung, after the  river in New York State.

 , an ocean tug built and launched in 1917 as USS Pocahontas.
 , commissioned in 1941 and served until decommissioning in 1970.

Sources
 

United States Navy ship names